Winters Independent School District is a public school district based in Winters, Texas (USA).

Located in Runnels County, the district extends into a small portion of Taylor County.

The school mascot is the Blizzard.

In 2009, the school district was rated "academically acceptable" by the Texas Education Agency.

History 
On July 1, 1991, it absorbed the Wingate Independent School District.

The same year, a national Future Farmers of America (FFA) Club was started in Kansas City, Mo. On April 10, 1930, the first Texas chapter for the national organization was issued to the club in Winters.

The district changed to a four day school week in fall 2022.

References

Distinguished Alumni Honorees
The Winters Independent School District and WHS Alumni Association established the "Winters High School Distinguished Alumnus Award" in 2013 to recognize former graduates who have accomplished extraordinary achievements in their life's work. They must have graduated at least 10 years prior to year in which nominated, should have been a leader in his/her field or made a significant contribution, and/or brought exceptional distinction to the individual or their community.

2022 Distinguished Alumni

Winford Hogan- WHS Class of 1953

John Andrae- WHS Class of 1989

Angela Perkins- WHS Class of 1994

2021 Distinguished Alumni Honorees

Mr. Kenneth Marks, WHS Class of 1950

Dr. Mary Jane Matthews Wray, WHS Class of 1963

Mr. Jimmy Gonzales, WHS Class of 1968

Mr. Thomas Chapmond, WHS Class of 1970

2020 ~ No Distinguished Alumni Honorees, Due to the COVID pandemic.

2019Distinguished Alumni Honorees

Mr. Donald Roland, WHS Class of 1960

Mrs. Barbie (Bradley) Chambers, PhD, WHS Class of 1990

Mr. Wylie Clough, WHS Class of 1994

Mrs. Charles Bahlman, WHS Class of 1964, Posthumous Alumnus

2018Distinguished Alumni Honorees

Mrs. Eloisa Lopez Castro WHS Class of 1947

Harvey Michael Jones, MD WHS Class of 1958

Charles Simpson, PhD WHS Class of 1958

2017 Distinguished Alumni Honorees

Mr. Baily R Mayo WHS Class of 1954

Mrs. Barbara Baldwin Pearce WHS Class of 1964

Mr. Terry R Gerhart WHS Class of 1979

2016 Distinguished Alumni Honorees

Dr. Ann Calahan WHS Class of 1965

Mr. Geoffrey S. Connor ( 104th Texas Secretary of State) WHS Class of 1981

Lt Col Russell Parramore WHS Class of 1993

2015 Distinguished Alumni Honorees

Freddy Jonas WHS Class of 1954

Wendell E. Dorsett WHS Class of 1953

Posthumous Alumnus James "Jimmy"Smith, D.V.M. WHS Class of 1960

2014 Distinguished Alumni Honorees

Dr. Melba Lewis WHS Class of 1969

Jo Ray DeLaCruz WHS CLass of 1974

2013 Distinguished Alumni Honorees

Mr. Bill Little WHS Class of 1960

Mr. Bill Wheat WHS CLass of 1984

External links
Winters ISD - Official site.

School districts in Runnels County, Texas
School districts in Taylor County, Texas